Goran Zakarić (born 7 November 1992) is a Bosnian professional footballer who plays as a winger for Croatian side HNK Zadar.

Zakarić started his professional career at Kozara Gradiška, before joining Široki Brijeg in 2010. The following year, he moved to Dinamo Zagreb. His spell with the club was marked by many loans, until he eventually settled at Željezničar in 2017. A year later, he switched to Partizan. One year after, he signed with Universitatea Craiova. The following year, he joined Borac Banja Luka. After parting ways with Borac Banja Luka, Zakarić has, in a surprise move, decided to join HNK Zadar, a club that competes in the fourth tier of the Croatian football pyramid.

A former youth international for Bosnia and Herzegovina, Zakarić made his senior international debut in 2014, earning 11 caps since.

Club career

Early career
Zakarić started playing football at his hometown club Kozara Gradiška, whose youth setup he joined in 2001. He made his professional debut in 2009 at the age of 16.

In June 2010, he joined Široki Brijeg. On 31 July, he scored his first professional goal against Borac Banja Luka.

On 16 May 2011, he signed a seven-year contract with Croatian club Dinamo Zagreb. However, his spell with the team was marked by many loans, and he never got first-team opportunity.

Željezničar
In January 2017, Zakarić moved to Željezničar on a two-year deal. On 26 February, he debuted for the side in an away win over Krupa. He scored his first goal with Željezničar against Radnik Bijeljina on 18 March.

On 18 April 2018, he scored his first career hat-trick against Sloboda Tuzla.

Zakarić won his first trophy with the club on 9 May, by triumphing over Krupa in Bosnian Cup final. Later that month, Zakarić was voted as best player in the league for the past season.

Partizan
After lengthy negotiations, Zakarić was transferred to Serbian side Partizan for a fee of €150,000 in August 2018. He scored on his competitive debut for the team, in UEFA Europa League qualifier against Nordsjælland. On 12 August, he made his league debut in a victory over Zemun. In a game against Voždovac on 5 October, he scored a brace, which were his first league goals for Partizan. Zakarić won his first trophy with the club on 23 May 2019, by beating city rivals Red Star Belgrade in Serbian Cup final.

On 6 September 2019, Zakarić and Partizan agreed to rescind his contract.

Later career stage

On 8 October 2019, Zakarić signed a four-year deal with Romanian outfit Universitatea Craiova.

In February 2020, he joined Borac Banja Luka on a one-year contract. On 6 August 2020, Zakarić extended his contract with Borac. He won his first trophy with Borac on 23 May 2021, getting crowned Bosnian Premier League champions one game before the end of the 2020–21 season.

On 27 January 2022, Zakarić joined Saudi Arabian club Ohod.

International career
Zakarić represented Bosnia and Herzegovina on various youth levels.

In August 2014, he received his first senior call-up, for games against Liechtenstein and Cyprus. Zakarić debuted in convincing friendly triumph over former on 4 September.

Personal life
Zakarić married his long-time girlfriend Tanja in July 2016. They have two daughters, Amber and Lana.

Career statistics

Club

International

Honours
Zrinjski Mostar
Bosnian Premier League: 2015–16

Željezničar
Bosnian Cup: 2017–18

Partizan
Serbian Cup: 2018–19

Borac Banja Luka
Bosnian Premier League: 2020–21

Individual
Awards
Bosnian Premier League Player of the Season: 2017–18

References

External links

1992 births
Living people
People from Gradiška, Bosnia and Herzegovina
Serbs of Bosnia and Herzegovina
Bosnia and Herzegovina footballers
Bosnia and Herzegovina youth international footballers
Bosnia and Herzegovina under-21 international footballers
Bosnia and Herzegovina international footballers
Bosnia and Herzegovina expatriate footballers
Association football wingers
FK Kozara Gradiška players
NK Široki Brijeg players
GNK Dinamo Zagreb players
NK Lokomotiva Zagreb players
HŠK Zrinjski Mostar players
NK Slaven Belupo players
FK Željezničar Sarajevo players
FK Partizan players
CS Universitatea Craiova players
FK Borac Banja Luka players
Ohod Club players
First League of the Republika Srpska players
Premier League of Bosnia and Herzegovina players
Croatian Football League players
Serbian SuperLiga players
Liga I players
Saudi First Division League players
Expatriate footballers in Croatia
Expatriate footballers in Serbia
Expatriate footballers in Romania
Expatriate footballers in Saudi Arabia
Bosnia and Herzegovina expatriate sportspeople in Croatia
Bosnia and Herzegovina expatriate sportspeople in Serbia
Bosnia and Herzegovina expatriate sportspeople in Romania
Bosnia and Herzegovina expatriate sportspeople in Saudi Arabia